Punsch-roll (Swedish: dammsugare) is a Swedish small cylindrical pastry covered with green marzipan with the ends dipped in chocolate, with an interior consisting of a mix of crushed biscuits, butter, and cocoa, flavoured with punsch liqueur.

Name 
This pastry is often called dammsugare ("vacuum cleaner"), referring not only to its appearance, but also to the supposed practice of the pastry baker collecting crumbs from yesterday's cookies for filling. Other names are arraksrulle (as arrak is an ingredient in punsch) and "150-ohmare" ('150-ohmer'; because a brown-green-brown colour sequence on a resistor denotes a resistance value of 150Ω.)

Variations 
A similar pastry in Denmark is called træstamme ("tree trunk"). These however, are usually not colored green and no liquor is added to the cookie butter.

The Dutch variant is called a mergpijpje ("little marrowbone"). The mergpijpje is cream-colored instead of green, and comes in two variants. A small variant with cream filling, and a large variant, reuze mergpijp ("giant marrowbone"), filled with cake and a layer of cream. The reuze mergpijp is sometimes also filled with a thin layer of berry jam.

See also 
 Cookie butter

References

Swedish pastries
Marzipan